Noah Tepperberg (born August 15, 1975) is an American businessman and co-founder of several New York City nightclubs and restaurants, including Marquee, Tao, Avenue and Lavo.

Biography
Tepperberg is a graduate of Stuyvesant High School. He earned a BBA degree from the University of Miami with a double major in business management and entrepreneurship.

Career

In 1997, Noah Tepperberg and Jason Strauss, his high school friend, founded Strategic Hospitality Group that offered consumers a premium nightlife experience.

In 2003, Tepperberg and Strauss opened Marquee nightclub in New York City. Soon thereafter, they partnered with Tao founders Marc Packer and Rich Wolf to open TAO at The Venetian Las Vegas and added partner Lou Abin to the Tao Group in 2008.

In May 2009 they introduced AVENUE in New York’s Chelsea neighborhood. In September 2010, they opened LAVO Restaurant and Nightclub in New York City. Together with his Tao Group partners, Tepperberg opened Marquee Nightclub and Dayclub at Cosmopolitan of Las Vegas on New Year’s Eve 2011.

In June 2011, they launched Dream Downtown Hotel in New York City. In March 2012, Tepperberg and his TAO Group partners launched Marquee at The Star Casino in Sydney, Australia. In September 2013, they launched TAO Downtown in New York City.

On February 1, 2017 Tepperberg, along with his partners, sold a majority stake in Tao Group to the Madison Square Garden Company. They continue to run the day-to-day operations of the company.

Personal life
In 2016, Tepperberg married model and health and wellness coach Melissa Wood in a ceremony at the Plaza Hotel in Manhattan. He and his wife live in New York City and have two children.

References

1975 births
Living people
University of Miami Business School alumni
Stuyvesant High School alumni
American company founders